Phil Cortes (born April 21, 1982 in Campbellton, New Brunswick, Canada) is a Canadian racing cyclist.

In 2012, he is the directeur Sportif for Garneau Quebecor, a Canadian cycling team. That same year, Phil Cortes led his team to the Tour de Guadeloupe, with rider Bruno Langlois ranking second in the final general classification.

Palmares 

2006
• 3rd : à Classic Chlorophylle (CAN)
• 1st : à Bear Mountain Spring Classic NY (USA)
• 1st Stage 1 : Tobago International (TRD)
• 2nd Stage 3 : Tobago International (TRD)
• 3rd General Classification : Tobago International (TRD)
2008
• 1st Stage 6 : Vuelta a Costa Rica, Guápiles (CRC)
2009
• 2nd Stage 2 : Tour de Beauce, Thetford (CAN)

References

External links 

Phil Cortes' profile on Cyclingbase.com

Canadian male cyclists
1982 births
Living people
People from Campbellton, New Brunswick